Lugsteuring (Air Disturbance) is the first full-length album from the South African alternative rock band Fokofpolisiekar (Fuck Off Police Car). It was released in 2004 by Rhythm Records in South Africa.

Track listing

In order to commemorate 10 years since the release of Lugsteuring, the album has been re-released on vinyl. A limited run of 500 copies were pressed.

References

2004 albums
Fokofpolisiekar albums